The II Corps (nicknamed "Double Dragons") is a corps of the Republic of Korea Army and it was first activited during the Korean War.

History
The II Corps was created on July 24, 1950, just before the Battle of Pusan Perimeter, consisting of the 1st Infantry Division and the 6th Infantry Division. During the Battle of the Pusan Perimeter (July–September, 1950), its headquarters was at Hamch’ang.

Currently, its headquarters is located in Chuncheon.

Korean War

Liberation of South Korea
Lieutenant General Walton Walker of the US Army ordered that ROK Army units, scattered by the North Korean invasion, be organized into two corps. Thus the II Corps was born July 24, 1950 to defend the Pusan Perimeter.

Invading North Korea
On October 10, 1950, the II Corps advanced north of the 38th parallel through central North Korea. They were operating in support of the ROK I Corps which was under the command of General Walker. After encountering minimal resistance, the corps veered northwest.

Defeat at Ch'ongch'on
On October 24, hoping to end the conflict quickly, General Douglas MacArthur, Commander of UN forces, ordered an offensive to the northern border of North Korea and form a defensive line at the Yalu River. At the Battle of the Ch'ongch'on River in October 1950, the Chinese People's Volunteer Army sent the 13th Army in to catch the II Corps off guard. In doing so, battles were fought in various places such as Onjong and Unsan. By November 4, 1950, the II Corps and the 8th Regiment of the US 1st Cavalry Division were destroyed.

Current structure
 II Corps, Chuncheon Headquarters
  7th Infantry Division, 'THE SEVEN STARS UNIT'
 Headquarters and Headquarters Battalion
 3rd Infantry Regiment
 5th Infantry Regiment
 8th Infantry Regiment
 Artillery regiment
  15th Infantry Division, 'THE VICTORY UNIT'
 Headquarters and headquarters battalion
 38th Infantry Regiment
 39th Infantry Regiment
 50th Infantry Regiment
 Artillery regiment
  27th Infantry Division
 Headquarters and headquarters battalion
 77th Infantry Regiment
 78th Infantry Regiment
 79th Infantry Regiment
 Artillery regiment
  3rd Armored Brigade
 2nd Engineer Brigade
 2nd Artillery Brigade
 2nd Logistics Support Brigade
 102nd Signal Brigade
 721 Signal Battalion
 722 Signal Battalion
 702nd Special Assault Regiment
 302nd Security Regiment
 Armed forces hospital at Chuncheon
 Headquarters and headquarters battalion
 Headquarters and headquarters company

References

Corps0002
Corps0002SK
Military units and formations established in 1950
South Korea